Brundall Church Fen is a   Local Nature Reserve  Norfolk. It is owned by Brundall Parish Council  and managed by Brundall Parish Council and Norfolk County Council and the Broads Authority.

Fauna in this former gazing marsh include water voles, foxes, Chinese water deer and occasionally otters.

There is access from Church Lane.

References

Local Nature Reserves in Norfolk